Pailou is a small mining town about 20 kilometers southeast of Haicheng, Liaoning in Northeast China. A large magnesium mine (Xiafangshen mine) is located just south of town. Agricultural activities are present.

This town consists of a main boulevard that extends from west to east.

See also 
 List of township-level divisions of Liaoning

References 

Haicheng, Liaoning
Towns in Liaoning